RMS Aquitania was a British ocean liner of the Cunard Line in service from 1914 to 1950. She was designed by Leonard Peskett and built by John Brown & Company in Clydebank, Scotland. She was launched on 21 April 1913 and sailed on her maiden voyage from Liverpool to New York on 30 May 1914. Shortly after Aquitania entered service, World War I broke out, during which she was first converted into an auxiliary cruiser before being used as a troop transport and a hospital ship, notably as part of the Dardanelles Campaign.

Returned to transatlantic passenger service in 1920, she served alongside the Mauretania and the Berengaria. Considered during this period of time as one of the most attractive ships,  Aquitania earned the nickname  "the Ship Beautiful" from her passengers. She continued in service after the merger of Cunard Line with White Star Line in 1934.

However, the outbreak of World War II allowed the ship to remain in service for ten more years. During the war and until 1947, she served as a troop transport. She was used in particular to take home Canadian soldiers from Europe. After the war, she transported migrants to Canada before the Board of Trade found her unfit for further commercial service. Aquitania was retired from service in 1949 and was sold for scrapping the following year. Having served as a passenger ship for 36 years, Aquitania ended her career as the longest-serving Cunard vessel, a record which stood for six years until overtaken by RMS Scythia's service record of 37 years. In 2004 Aquitania's service record was pushed into third place when Queen Elizabeth 2 became the longest-serving Cunard vessel.

Conception 

The origins of Aquitania lay in the rivalry between the White Star Line and Cunard Line, Britain's two leading shipping companies. The White Star Line's ,  and the upcoming  were larger than the latest Cunard ships, Mauretania and Lusitania, by 15,000 gross register tons. The Cunard duo were significantly faster than the White Star ships, while White Star's ships were seen as more luxurious. Cunard needed another liner for its weekly transatlantic express service, and elected to copy the White Star Line's Olympic-class model with a slower but larger and more luxurious ship. The plan for the building of that liner began in 1910. Several draft plans were conceived in order to determine the main axes of what should be the ship for which an average speed of 24 knots was planned. In July of that year, the company launched the construction offers to several shipyards before choosing John Brown and Company, the builder of the Lusitania. The company chose Aquitania as the name for its new ship in continuity with those of its two previous duo. The three ships were named respectively after the Ancient Roman provinces Lusitania, Mauretania, and Gallia Aquitania.

Design, construction and launch 

Aquitania was designed by Cunard naval architect Leonard Peskett. Peskett drew up plans for a larger and wider vessel than Lusitania and Mauretania (about  longer). With four large funnels the ship would resemble the famous speed duo, but Peskett also designed the superstructure with "glassed in" touches from the smaller , a ship he also designed. Another design feature from Carmania was the addition of two tall forward deck ventilator cowlings. Although the ship's outward dimensions were greater than that of Olympic, her displacement and tonnage were lower. With Aquitanias keel being laid at the end of 1910, the experienced Peskett took a voyage on Olympic in 1911 so as to experience the feel of a ship reaching nearly 50,000 tonnes as well as to copy pointers for his company's new vessel. Though Aquitania was built solely with Cunard funds, Peskett designed her according to strict British Admiralty specifications. Aquitania was built in the John Brown and Company yards in Clydebank, Scotland, where the majority of the Cunard ships were built. Just like with Mauretania, for the launch the hull was painted in a light grey colour for photographic purposes; a common practice of the day for the first ship in a new class, as it made the lines of the ship clearer in the black-and-white photographs. Her hull was repainted to black in dry dock.

In the wake of the Titanic sinking, Aquitania was one of the first new ships to carry enough lifeboats for all passengers and crew. Eighty lifeboats, including two motorised launches with Marconi wireless equipment, were carried in both swan-neck and newer Welin type davits. There was also a double hull and watertight compartments that were designed to allow the ship to float with five compartments flooded. As required by the British Admiralty, she was designed to be converted into an armed merchant cruiser, and was reinforced to mount guns for service in that role. The ship displaced approximately 49,430 tons, of which the hull accounted for 29,150 tons, machinery 9,000 and bunkers 6,000 tons.

Aquitania was launched on 21 April 1913 after being christened by Alice Stanley, the Countess of Derby, and fitted out over the next thirteen months. Notable installations were electrical wiring and decorations. The fitting out was led by Arthur Joseph Davis and his associate Charles Mewès. On 10 May 1914, she was tested in her sea trials and steamed at one full knot over the expected speed. On 14 May, she reached Mersey and stayed at a port there for fifteen days, during which she underwent a final major cleaning and finishing in preparation for her maiden voyage.

Technical aspects 

Aquitania was the first Cunard liner to have a length in excess of 900 feet. Unlike some four-funneled ships, such as White Star Line's s, Aquitania did not have a dummy funnel; each funnel was utilised in venting smoke from the ship's boilers.

Each boiler room had seven ash expellers with pump capacity of approximately 4,500 tons per hour that could also be used as emergency bilge pumps.

Steam drove Parsons turbines in three separate engine rooms in a triple expansion system for four shafts.

The electrical plant, located on G deck below the waterline, consisted of four 400 kW British Westinghouse generator sets generating 225 volt direct current, with emergency power provided by a diesel driven 30 kW generator up on the promenade deck. Power was provided for about 10,000 lamps and about 180 electric motors. She also had brass triple chambered 3 chime steam whistles on the 1st funnel and 2nd funnel.

Interior and design 

In 1914, Aquitania had the capacity to carry 3,220 passengers (618 First Class, 614 Second Class, 2,004 Third Class). After a refit in 1926, the figure was reduced to 610 in first class, 950 in second class, and 640 in tourist class. Although the original specification mentioned a capacity of 972 crew members, the ship sometimes carried around 1,100.

Although Aquitania lacked the lean, yacht-like appearance of running mates Mauretania and Lusitania, the greater length and wider beam allowed for grander and more spacious public rooms. Her public spaces were designed by the British architect Arthur Joseph Davis of the interior decorating firm Mewès and Davis. This firm had overseen the construction and decoration of the Ritz Hotel in London and Davis himself had designed several banks in that city. His partner in the firm, Charles Mewès, had designed the interiors of the Paris Ritz, and had been commissioned by Albert Ballin, head of Germany's Hamburg America Line (HAPAG), to decorate the interiors of the company's new liner Amerika in 1905.

In a curious arrangement between the rival Cunard and Hamburg-Amerika Lines, Mewès and Davis worked apart—in Germany and England respectively and exclusively—with neither partner being able to disclose details of his work to the other. Although this arrangement was almost certainly violated, Aquitanias first-class interiors were largely the work of Davis. The Louis XVI dining saloon owed much to Mewès' work on the HAPAG liners, but it is likely that having worked so closely together for many years the two designers' work had become almost interchangeable. Indeed, Davis must be given credit for the Carolean smoking room and the Palladian lounge; a faithful interpretation of the style of architect John Webb.

The second class had a dining room, several lounges, a smoking room, a veranda café, and a gymnasium; many being unique facilities for this class on British liners. The third class had several common areas, a promenade, and three shared bathrooms. The cabins offered great comfort. The first class included eight luxury suites, named after famous painters. A large number of first-class cabins had bathrooms, although not all did. The second-class cabins were larger than average, most being capable of accommodating three people as opposed to the standard four. Her Third Class accommodations were a great expansion in facilities compared to her running mates. While most Cunard liners had their Third Class areas confined forward, aboard Aquitania such spaces spanned the full length of the ship, and included several large open areas, three large dining rooms and both open and enclosed promenades.

Over her thirty-five years career, her facilities changed. Examples of this were the addition of a cinema during her refit from 1932 to 1933 and the reorganisation of the tourist class during the 1920s for giving greater comfort to poor passengers.

Early career and World War I 

Aquitanias maiden voyage was under the command of Captain William Turner on 30 May 1914 with arrival in New York on 5 June. The voyage and arrival in New York received great attention. Fifteen days later, the German liner , being the largest ship in the world at the time, was put into service. In the eye of the press, this maiden voyage was a matter of national prestige. However, no passenger cancelled their voyage aboard the Aquitania, despite the strong emotion aroused by this sinking. During her maiden voyage, the ship carried around 1,055 passengers, which was about a third of her total capacity. This was because a superstition pushed some people away from travelling on a ship's maiden voyage. The crossing fully satisfied the crew and the company. The ship briefly managed to exceed 25 knots. Also, her coal consumption was significantly lower than that of Lusitania and Mauretania. Many passengers enjoyed the voyage. On the return trip, the success was renewed; she carried a total of 2,649 passengers, which was a record for a British liner leaving New York.

Upon arrival at her home port, she underwent minor modifications, which took into account observations made during the two first crossings (this was typical for a liner after its first round trip). Two more round trips took place in the second half of June and the whole of July of that year. Her architect Leonard Peskett was on board during those trips to note any defect and room for improvement. In total, 11,208 passengers travelled on the ship during her first six crossings. Her career was abruptly interrupted by the outbreak of World War I, which removed her from passenger service for six years.

In June 1914 Archduke Franz Ferdinand of Austria was assassinated, and the world was soon plunged into World War I. Aquitania was converted into an armed merchant cruiser on 5 August 1914, for which provision had been made in her design. On 8 August, having been rid of decorative elements and armed with guns, she was sent on patrol. On 22 August, she collided with a liner named Canadian. Shortly after, the Admiralty found that large liners were too expensive to operate as cruisers. On 30 September, she was repaired, disarmed, and returned to Cunard Line.

After being idle for a time, in the spring of 1915 she was recalled by the Admiralty and converted into a troopship, and made voyages to the Dardanelles, sometimes running alongside Britannic or Mauretania. Around 30,000 men were transported on the ship to the battlefield between May and August of that year. Aquitania then was converted into a hospital ship, and acted in that role during the Dardanelles campaign. In 1916, the year that White Star's flagship, and one of Aquitanias main rivals, Britannic, was sunk, Aquitania was returned to the trooping front, and then in 1917 was laid up in the Solent. In 1918, now under the command of James Charles, the ship was back on the high seas in troopship service, conveying North American troops to Britain. Many of these departures were from the port of Halifax, Nova Scotia where the ship's dazzle paint scheme was captured by artists and photographers, including Antonio Jacobsen. On one occasion Aquitania transported over 8,000 men. During her nine voyages, she transported approximately a total of 60,000 men. During this period, she collided with USS Shaw and tore apart its bow. The accident killed a dozen members of the American ship's crew.

After the end of the war, in December 1918, Aquitania was dismissed from military service. She collided with the British cargo ship   at New York in the United States on 28 February 1919. Lord Dufferin sank and Aquitania rescued her crew. Lord Dufferin was later refloated and beached.

Interwar career
In June 1919, Aquitania ran a Cunard "austerity service" between Southampton and New York. In December of that year Aquitania was docked at the Armstrong Whitworth yards in Newcastle to be refitted for post-war service. The ship was converted from coal burner to oil-fired, which greatly reduced the number of engine room crew required. The original fittings and art pieces, removed when refitted for military use, were brought out of storage and re-installed. At some point during this time, a new wheelhouse was constructed above the original one as the officers had complained about the visibility over the ship's bow. The second wheelhouse can be seen in later pictures of the era and the original wheelhouse area below had the windows plated in.

1920s

Aquitania resumed her commercial service on 17 July 1920, leaving from Liverpool with 2,433 passengers on board. The crossing was a success; the ship maintained good speed while showing that now being oil-fueled was much cheaper than coal-fueled propulsion. The ship's arrival in New York Harbor was filmed as part of the pioneering 1921 documentary Manhatta, in which she is seen being pushed to her destination by tugboats. The months that followed were just as promising, despite a stewards' strike in May 1921. At the beginning of the decade, Aquitania was the only large liner in the service of Cunard Line as the Mauretania was undergoing repair after a fire. The year 1921 was thus an exceptional year for her; she broke a record by transporting around 60,000 passengers that year. In the following year, the Mauretania rejoined her in Cunard service.

In 1924, a new restriction on immigration was passed in the United States, causing the number of third-class passengers to decline significantly. From about 26,000 third-class passengers transported by Aquitania in 1921, the figure fell to about 8,200 third-class passengers in 1925. The number of crew was thus reduced to around 850 people from the original 1,200. The third class was no longer the key to the profitability of the liner, and so the company had to adapt. The third-class gradually became a tourist class, which offered decent service at a low price. In 1926, the ship underwent a major overhaul, which reduced the passenger capacity from around 3,300 to around 2,200.

Still, the Cunard Line benefited from prohibition in the United States, which started in 1919. American liners were legally part of the territory of the United States, and thus alcoholic beverages could not be served on them. Passengers who wanted to drink therefore travelled on British liners in order to do so. Aquitania enjoyed great success, making much profit for her company. In 1929, she underwent a major refit. A bathroom was added to many first-class cabins, and the tourist class was renovated. While new competitors, such as the German liner SS Bremen, entered service, Aquitania remained particularly popular after fifteen years of service.

Crisis of 1929 and its consequences
Following the stock market crash of 1929, many ships were affected by the economic downturn and reduced traffic. Aquitania found herself in a tough position. Only a few could afford expensive passage on her now, so Cunard sent Aquitania on cheap cruises to the Mediterranean. These were successful, especially for Americans who went on "booze cruises," tired of their country's prohibition. Another problem also arose: the two liners of the Norddeutscher Lloyd, SS Bremen and SS Europa, successfully captured the Blue Riband and many customers. In 1934, the number of passengers Aquitania carried declined to around 13,000 from 30,000 in 1929. The ship, however, remained popular and she was the third busiest in the early 1930s behind those two German liners.

To keep the ship up to date, she underwent a refit, which added a cinema, between 1932 and 1933. At the same time, in order to modernise its fleet, the company ordered the Queen Mary. The Great Depression, however, prevented the company from being able to fully finance the construction, and the company merged with its rival, the White Star Line, in 1934 in order to do so. The Queen Mary entered service in 1936. Author C. R. Bonsor writing in 1963 states, from 1936 on it became necessary to squeeze the maximum speed out of Aquitania in order to make her a suitable running mate for Queen Mary thus 24 knot passages became regular. Aquitania ran aground in the Solent on 24 January 1934 but was refloated later the same day. The merger of the two companies into Cunard-White Star Line resulted in a large surplus of liners being owned by a single company. Thus, very old ships, such as the Mauretania and the Olympic, were removed from service immediately and sent to the scrapyard. However, the Aquitania was not, despite her age. On 10 April 1935, Aquitania went hard aground on Thorne Knoll in the Solent near Southampton, England, but with the aid of ten tugboats, on the next high tide the ship was freed. When the new liner RMS Queen Elizabeth was due to enter service in 1940, newspapers speculated that Aquitania would be scrapped that year. However, during that period, her performance continued to satisfy her company. The year 1939 saw an increase in the number of wealthy passengers on board. The ship was then already 26 years old.

World War II service
Aquitania, with a normal troop capacity of 7,400, was among the select group of large, fast former passenger ships capable of sailing independently without escort transporting large numbers of troops that were assigned worldwide as needed.

Plans to replace Aquitania with the newer Queen Elizabeth in 1940 had been forestalled by outbreak of World War II in 1939. She returned to Southampton and was requisitioned on 18 November.

Aquitanias initial troop transport operation was taking Canadian troops to Scotland, Convoy TC1 in company with Empress of Britain, Empress of Australia, Duchess of Bedford, Monarch of Bermuda, HMS Hood, HMS Warspite, HMS Barham, HMS Resolution, HMS Repulse, HMS Furious, December 1939. Meanwhile, a massive transport of Australian and New Zealand troops to Suez and North Africa, with possible diversion to the United Kingdom if events required, was in planning with the numbered convoys to be designated as "US" with the large Atlantic liners assigned a role. Joined off Sydney by Queen Mary and Mauretania the convoy sailed the same day to be joined the next by Empress of Canada from Melbourne for a stop at Fremantle 10–12 May before the voyage intended to be for Colombo. The convoy arrived in the Clyde and anchored off Gourock on 16 June 1940.

Now repainted battleship grey, in November 1941 Aquitania was in the British colony of Singapore, from which she sailed to take part indirectly in the loss of the Australian cruiser . Sydney had engaged in battle with the German auxiliary cruiser . There has been much unsubstantiated speculation that Kormoran was expecting Aquitania, after spies in Singapore had notified Kormorans crew of the liner's sailing, and planned to ambush her in the Indian Ocean west of Perth but instead encountered Sydney on 19 November. Both ships were lost after a fierce battle. On the morning of 24 November Aquitania en route to Sydney from Singapore spotted and picked up twenty-six survivors of the German ship but maintained radio silence and did not pass word until in visual range of Wilson's Promontory on 27 November. The captain had gone against orders not to stop for survivors of sinkings. There were no survivors from Sydney.

December saw the outbreak of war in the Pacific, then Japanese advances throughout Southeast Asia and toward Australia, necessitating the redeployment of defensive forces. On 28 December Aquitania and two smaller transports departed Sydney with 4,150 Australian troops and 10,000 tons of equipment for Port Moresby, New Guinea. Aquitania was back in Sydney on 8 January 1942. The next effort was reinforcement of Singapore and the Netherlands East Indies with Aquitania transporting Australian troops (whose equipment was in Convoy MS.1) as the single ship MS.2 convoy, under escort of HMAS Canberra. The ship had been the only suitable transport for such a large movement. Originally, transport directly to Singapore was considered, but the danger from aircraft to such a valuable asset and so many troops caused a change of plans. Instead, Aquitania departed Sydney on 10 January, reaching Ratai Bay at the Sunda Strait on 20 January, where 3,456 personnel (including some Navy, Air Force and civilians) were transhipped under a covering naval force to seven smaller vessels (six of them Dutch KPM ships) that would continue to Singapore as convoy MS.2A. Aquitania was returned to Sydney on 31 January.

With the United States in the war, Aquitania (then with a troop capacity of 4,500) had been scheduled for transport duties from the United States to Australia in February, but necessary repairs delayed that. Because her deep draft was hazardous in Australian and intermediate ports in the Pacific Islands, she spent March and April 1942 transporting troops from the west coast of the U.S. to Hawaii.  Then Aquitania was temporarily transferred from Pacific duties to support the movement of troops from the United States to Britain, sailing 30 April from New York in a large convoy that transported some 19,000 troops.
On 12 May 1942 Aquitania loaded troops at Gourock destined for the war in the Middle East, departing in convoy WS19P on 1 June with destroyers and heavy weather, she broke off independently on 7 June due to her greater speed with designation WS19Q. The first port of call was 48 hours at Freetown (West Africa) on 11 June, then 3 days at Simonstown, South Africa 20 June 48 hours at Diego Suarez, Madagascar from 30 June 24 hours at Steamer Point, Aden on 3 July, and then disembarkation at Port Tewfik, Egypt from 8 July 1942. The return journey was via Diego Suarez, Cape Town, Freetown and then to Boston. By September Aquitania was engaged in a triangular troop deployment of United States-United Kingdom-Indian Ocean voyages.

As part of the major redeployment of Australian troops from North Africa to the defence of Australia and start of offensive operations in the Southwest Pacific. Aquitania, Queen Mary, Île de France, Nieuw Amsterdam, and the armed merchant cruiser HMS Queen of Bermuda transported the Australian 9th Division to Sydney in Operation Pamphlet during January and February 1943.

By the buildup for the invasion of Europe in 1944 troop deployments to Britain depended heavily on Aquitania and the other "Monsters" and no allowance could be made for interruption of their service for other transport requirements.

Wartime embarkation at New York is described in some detail in the description of the departure of the Special Navy Advance Group 56 (SNAG 56) that was to become Navy Base Hospital Number 12 at the Royal Victoria Hospital, Netley, England, to receive casualties from Normandy. The unit was sent by "devious routes" by train to Jersey City where under cover of darkness they boarded a ferry crossing to the covered pier 86 in New York where a band played and the Red Cross served their last coffee and doughnuts as they boarded "N.Y. 40", the New York Port of Embarkation code designation for Aquitania, which got underway the morning of 29 January 1944 with some 1,000 Navy and 7,000 Army personnel for arrival at Gourock, Scotland 5 February.

In eight years of military work, Aquitania sailed more than 500,000 miles, and carried nearly 400,000 soldiers, to and from places as far afield as New Zealand, Australia, the South Pacific, Greece and the Indian Ocean.

Postwar service and retirement 

After completing troopship service, the vessel was handed back to Cunard-White Star in 1948. She underwent a refit for passenger service. She was then used to transport war brides and their children to Canada under charter from the Canadian government.  This final service created a special fondness for Aquitania in Halifax, Nova Scotia, the port of disembarkation for these immigration voyages.

On completion of that task in December 1949, Aquitania was taken out of service when the ship's Board of Trade certificate was not renewed as the condition of the ship had deteriorated, and it would have been cost-prohibitive to be brought up to new safety standards, namely fire code regulations. The decks leaked in foul weather, the bulkheads and funnels were corroded to a point that one could stick their finger through them.  A long standing rumor was made that during a corporate luncheon held on the ship, a piano had fallen through the roof of one of the dining rooms from the deck above. This has been proven to be false.

The vessel was retired and sold to British Iron and Steel Corporation for scrap for £125,000 in 1950 at Faslane in Scotland. Dismantling took almost a year to complete. This ended a career which included steaming 3 million miles over 450 round voyages. Aquitania carried 1.2 million passengers through an active sea career that spanned nearly 36 years, making her the longest-serving Express Liner of the 20th century. Aquitania was the only major liner, and the largest commercial vessel, to serve in both World Wars.  She was also the last four-funnelled passenger ship to be scrapped. The ship's wheel and a detailed scale model of Aquitania may be seen in the Cunard exhibit at the Maritime Museum of the Atlantic in Halifax.

Maritime author N. R. P. Bonsor wrote of Aquitania in 1963: "Cunard had recovered possession of their veteran in 1948 but she was not worth reconditioning. In 35 years of service Aquitania had sailed more than 3 million miles and apart from one or two early Allan Line steamers no other ship served for as long in a single ownership."

References

Bibliography

External links

 Aquitania Home at "Atlantic Liners.com"
 
 A First-Hand Account of a Second World War Voyage on the Aquitania (PDF Download)
 Aquitania on Lost Liners.com 
 Atlantic Liners: A Trio of Trios, by J. Kent Layton
 Grace's Guide page on Aquitania

 

Ships of the Cunard Line
Steamships of the United Kingdom
Passenger ships of the United Kingdom
Ships built on the River Clyde
Four funnel liners
Maritime incidents in 1918
Maritime incidents in 1919
Maritime incidents in 1934
Maritime incidents in 1935
World War I Auxiliary cruisers of the Royal Navy
1913 ships
Hospital ships in World War I